Radu Niculescu (born 11 November 1909, date of death unknown) was a Romanian footballer who played as a midfielder.

International career
Radu Niculescu played one match for Romania, on 10 May 1931 under coach Constantin Rădulescu in a 5–2 victory against Bulgaria at the 1929–31 Balkan Cup. He was also part of Romania's 1924 Summer Olympics squad.

References

External links
 

1909 births
Year of death missing
Romanian footballers
Romania international footballers
Olympic footballers of Romania
Footballers at the 1924 Summer Olympics
Place of birth missing
Association football midfielders
Olympia București players